Wang Wei (born 15 September 1979) was a former Chinese badminton player from Shanghai. In the junior event, he participated at the 1996 World Junior Championships clinched a gold medal in the mixed doubles event with Lu Ying. 

In 2001, he represented Shanghai at the National Games, and won a gold medal in the men's doubles event with Zhang Wei. He also won a bronze medal at the Asian Championships in the men's doubles event with Cheng Rui.

Wang was part of the national men's team that won a bronze medal at the 2002 Asian Games in Busan, South Korea and at the Thomas Cup in Guangzhou. Partnered with Zhao Tingting, he settled for a bronze medal at the Asian Championships in the mixed doubles event. His best achievements in the World Grand Prix tournament was a runner-up at the 2002 Malaysia Open in the mixed doubles event with Zhang Yawen.

In 2003, he was a mixed doubles runner-up at the National Championships tournament with his partner Zhang Jiewen. He competed at the World Championships with Cheng Rui in the men's doubles event, but finished in the quarter finals defeated by the Indonesian pair Sigit Budiarto and Candra Wijaya in straight games.

In 2004, he won a silver medal at the World University Championships.

He once served as a coach in Linyi Normal University, and as a Chinese national second team head coach.

Achievements

Asian Championships 
Men's doubles

Mixed doubles

World Junior Championships 
Mixed doubles

IBF World Grand Prix 
The World Badminton Grand Prix sanctioned by International Badminton Federation (IBF) since 1983.

Women's doubles

IBF International 
Men's doubles

Mixed doubles

References

External links 
 

1979 births
Living people
Badminton players from Shanghai
Chinese male badminton players
Badminton players at the 2002 Asian Games
Asian Games bronze medalists for China
Asian Games medalists in badminton
Medalists at the 2002 Asian Games
Chinese badminton coaches
World No. 1 badminton players